A Chaos of Desire is the fourth studio album by the Darkwave band Black Tape for a Blue Girl. It was released in 1991 by Projekt Records.

Track listing
Source: Projekt Records
These Fleeting Moments
A Chaos of Desire
Pandora's Box
Tear Love from My Mind
The Hypocrite Is Me
Beneath the Icy Floe
We Watch Our Sad-eyed Angel Fall
One Last Breath
Of These Reminders
How Can You Forget Love?
Chains of Color
Could I Stay the Honest One?

Sources

Black Tape for a Blue Girl albums
Projekt Records albums
1991 albums